Al-Hilal English School is a not-for-profit school in Manki, which was founded in 1989 by Sawood Hajika, and managed by Tarbiat Education Society. The school started off as a private venture but eventually partial control was passed to the government. It covers ages 3 to 18 and follows modern educational models.

History
Shabandri Iqbal, Shabandri Jaffar Sadik, Sawood Hajika founded Al-Hilal English School in 1989. It was started with just a block accommodating L.K.G. and U.K.G. The school was a success and soon, the number of students increased dramatically. This demanded a bigger campus which was expanded over the years in line with the increasing population. Presently it is having L.K.G. to 10th STD, and is all set to have its block for pre-university college within the campus.

Present strength
The present strength of the school is around 450 students. Since its establishment, more than 200 have graduated.

Buildings and grounds
The school owns land for further expansion. It includes the school building around 8000 sq ft, a playground, a mosque, and a residential building for teachers.

References 

 http://www.mankirocks.webs.com
 https://archive.today/20130223091131/http://alhilalschool.org/About%20Us.aspx
 http://www.bhatkallys.org/index.php?option=com_content&view=article&id=3160:manki-al-hilal-school-hosts-zonal-level-sports-meet-&catid=82:local&Itemid=459
 http://www.facebook.com/masak54
 http://www.daijiworld.com/news/news_disp.asp?n_id=114566
 https://web.archive.org/web/20040910071832/http://meltingpot.fortunecity.com/guam/385/nawayat.htm

Schools in Uttara Kannada district
Educational institutions established in 1989
1989 establishments in Karnataka